Waterloo was a parliamentary constituency centred on the district of Waterloo north of Liverpool in Lancashire.  It returned one Member of Parliament (MP) to the House of Commons of the Parliament of the United Kingdom, elected by the first past the post system.

History 

The constituency was created for the 1918 general election.  It was abolished for the 1950 general election.

Boundaries
The Urban Districts of Great Crosby, Litherland, Little Crosby, and Waterloo with Seaforth.

Members of Parliament

Election results

Elections in the 1910s

Elections in the 1920s

Elections in the 1930s

Elections in the 1940s

References

Parliamentary constituencies in North West England (historic)
Constituencies of the Parliament of the United Kingdom established in 1918
Constituencies of the Parliament of the United Kingdom disestablished in 1950
Metropolitan Borough of Sefton